Sir Edward Harwood (1586?–1632) was an English army officer, known for his role as commander in fighting in the Netherlands, and for his religious views.

Life
He was born about 1586, in Norfolk, and had an extended military career, entering Dutch service at age 13, gaining a company after combat at the Siege of Ostend. He took part in the Sluis campaign in 1604 under Horace Vere and was ranked captain by 1606 after the siege of Rheinberg. He became colonel of an English regiment in the Netherlands in 1622/3, by purchase from Viscount L'Isle; and was then one of the four standing colonels in the Low Countries. He was shot at the siege of Maastricht in 1632. His brother George Harwood belonged to the Feoffees for Impropriations.

Harwood was known as a lay supporter of Puritanism. In Dutch affairs leading up to the Synod of Dort, and at that time lieutenant-colonel in Viscount L'Isle's regiment, he was briefing George Abbot. He intervened in 1622 to secure the appointment of William Ames at the University of Franeker; and he also supported John Burges. He was a significant international connection for Puritans.

Harwood signed the Second Virginia Charter of 1609. He was also involved in the Somers Isles Company, and was a charter member of the Providence Island Company.

Memorial
In 1636, friends of Sir Edward Harwood had a memorial plaque erected in the Cloister Church in The Hague, where he was buried.

Works
In 1642, his brother George Harwood, a merchant of London, published The Advice of Sir E. Harwood, written by King Charles his Command, upon occasion of the French King's preparation, and presented in his life time by his owne hand, to his Majestie: … also a Relation of his life and death, by Hugh Peters, &c., London. It was reprinted in Harleian Miscellany, ed. Park. Peters met Harwood around 1630, and may have acted as his chaplain.

References

Attribution

External links
Translation of the memorial inscription to Harwood in the Kloosterkerk, The Hague.
 Biography

1586 births
1632 deaths
English army officers
17th-century English Puritans